David Dae-Hyun Cho is an American journalist and editor in chief of Barron's. He was formerly the business editor for The Washington Post.

Early life and education 
Cho was raised in New York. He was educated at the Juilliard School of Music in New York, where he studied piano, before receiving a BA in English Language and Literature from Yale in 1995. He then received an MA in Journalism, an MA in International Affairs, as well as an MBA from Columbia University.

Career 
Cho started his career as a staff writer for The Korean Herald in 1995 until he took an internship at The New York Times in 1997. After his internship, Cho joined The Philadelphia Inquirer as a staff writer before assuming the same role at The Star-Ledger in 1999, where he was a member of the team that was a Pulitzer Prize finalist in breaking news for its coverage of a deadly dorm fire at Seton Hall University. He moved to The Washington Post in 2001 and was a 2005-06 Knight-Bagehot fellow.

Cho's work covering the Global financial crisis of 2008 drew admiring attention. He won the Best of Knight-Bagehot Business Journalism Award for his coverage of events leading to the Crisis. His financial crisis coverage was also chosen by the Columbia School of Journalism as one of its "100 Great Stories" of the last century. He was a member of the Washington Post team that won the 2014 Pulitzer Prize for Public Service and contributed to the Washington Post's Pulitzer Prize-winning coverage of the Virginia Tech massacre. Cho was named business editor in 2016.

Personal life 
Cho married Sarra Pyun on December 30, 2001. They have two sons. Cho's mother is a Methodist pastor and his father is the owner and founder of Netlinc Technologies, a company that manufactures telecommunications hardware in New Jersey.

References

External links 

 David Cho on Twitter

Yale College alumni
The Washington Post people
1970s births
Living people
Columbia University Graduate School of Journalism alumni
School of International and Public Affairs, Columbia University alumni
American male journalists
American writers of Korean descent
Columbia Business School alumni